WXJM (88.7 FM) is an American non-commercial educational radio station licensed to serve Harrisonburg, Virginia, United States.  The station, established in 1990, is owned and operated by James Madison University. The station's broadcast license is held by the James Madison University Board of Visitors.

WXJM station management reports to the JMU Media Board, which is under the jurisdiction of the University Board of Visitors.  WXJM also receives guidance and technical support from WMRA.

Coverage
WXJM broadcasts a variety music format to the greater Harrisonburg metropolitan area. WXJM's tower and antenna sits atop Burruss Hall on the JMU campus. The station operates with an effective radiated power (ERP) of 390 watts.

History
The forerunner of WXJM was the audio stream played over a few James Madison University campus buildings' public address systems to give interested students some practice with broadcasting.  In the late 1980s and early 1990s, the "Dining Hall DJ's" advocated for airborne-broadcast capability. Early planners sought a callsign of WJMR for (W) James Madison Radio but were dismayed to learn that the letters were already taken by an existing station in Wisconsin, WJMR-FM.

The Board of Visitors of James Madison University filed an application with the Federal Communications Commission (FCC) to construct a new FM radio station in March 1988. This station would broadcast with 260 watts of effective radiated power from an antenna  in height above average terrain (HAAT). The FCC granted the original construction permit for this new station on September 1, 1989, with a scheduled expiration date of March 1, 1991.

The station was assigned the callsign "WZJM" by the FCC on October 31, 1989. Just a few weeks later, on November 17, 1989, this was changed to the current "WXJM" callsign. FM radios could pick up the signal, but reception off-campus was seldom possible.

The FCC authorized these changes in July 1990.

On October 10, 1990, WXJM applied for its license to cover. After the authorized modifications to the antenna were completed, the FCC granted the station its broadcast license on August 6, 1991.

Some of the early student radio announcers banded together in a club called the "Freak Possie".  The radio Freaks turned media arts class performance-art projects into pickets and absurdist attention-getting events to get publicity and to advocate for a stronger off-campus broadcast capability.
  Events included mass weddings to bananas and speeches by fursuit-wearing performers including a Three-Eyed Antlered Pig who mocked the university's official mascot, the Duke Dog.

In 2003, WXJM was levied a $3,000 forfeiture by the FCC due to public file documents which were "either filed late or are missing". The FCC declared the matter resolved with a notice of apparent liability in February 2008.

WXJM web-streaming started circa 2005.  WXJM's original slogan, "Music Your Mother Won't Like", changed circa 2006 to "Electrifying Wilson Hall".

In May 2011, WXJM enhanced its overnight broadcast automation capability so that when live announcers are not present, listeners hear Bluegrass music provided by Possum Music Service instead of dead air.

MACRoCk

Every spring since 1997, WXJM helps support the Mid-Atlantic College Radio Conference (MACRoCk) at various venues in and around Harrisonburg.  Some MACRoCks have drawn over 100 bands and over 4,000 concertgoers.

References

External links
88-7 WXJM Online
"WXJM Live!"  (weekly local/regional live music program)

James Madison University
XJM
Radio stations established in 1990
XJM
Variety radio stations in the United States
1990 establishments in Virginia